Leslie Buck (September 20, 1922 – April 26, 2010) was an American business executive and Holocaust survivor who designed the Anthora coffee cup, which has become an iconic symbol of New York City since its introduction in the 1960s.

Early life
Buck was born Laszlo Büch into a Jewish family on September 20, 1922, in Khust, Czechoslovakia (now part of Ukraine). Buck's parents were murdered during the Holocaust during World War II. Buck was imprisoned by the Nazis during the occupation, surviving his captivity at Auschwitz and Buchenwald concentration camps. Buck moved to the United States following World War II, settling in New York City. Once in the United States he adopted the anglicized name, Leslie Buck.

Career
Buck partnered with his brother, Eugene, and ran an import-export business. The two brothers launched a paper cup maker based in Mount Vernon, New York called Premier Cup sometime in the late 1950s. Buck left the family business to take a position with a start-up paper cup manufacturer called the Sherri Cup Company during the mid-1960s. He originally worked as Sherri Cup's sales manager, before becoming the company's marketing director.

Anthora coffee cup
As marketing director, Buck wanted to get Sherri Cup's products into New York City's diners and other eating establishments, many of which were owned by Greeks or Greek Americans. Buck designed the Anthora paper coffee cup using the blue and white colors of the Greek flag, though he was not trained as an artist. The name of the Anthora coffee cup came from a mispronunciation of the Greek word, amphora, as Buck pronounced it with an Eastern European accent.

Buck designed the Anthora cup with the amphora, a Greek vase or urn, down two sides of the cup. The front of the cup pictured three gold-colored hot coffee cups. The cup's motto, "We Are Happy To Serve You", is written across the cup, originally using a Classical font, though the words have changed at times since its design by Buck.

Buck's Anthora cup was introduced in the mid-1960s and became a huge success throughout New York City. The cups became a ubiquitous symbol of the city, appearing in New York themed television shows including Law & Order. For decades, hundreds of millions of the cups were sold annually. In 1994, the Sherri Cup company sold 500 million Anthora cups.

Though not as widespread as it once was due to the growth of Starbucks and other coffee chains in New York City, the Solo Cup Company, which acquired the Sherri Cup Company, still sold approximately 200 million Anthora cups in 2005, and continued to manufacture Buck's cup upon request as of 2010.

Leslie Buck retired from Sherri Cup in 1992. The company gave him 10,000 specially made Anthora cups, each with an inscription, to celebrate his retirement.

Personal life
Buck married Ella Farkas in 1949. They had two daughters and a son. At the time of his death, Buck lived in Glen Cove, New York and Delray Beach, Florida. He previously lived in Syosset, New York.

Buck died of Parkinson's disease at his home in Glen Cove on April 26, 2010, at the age of 87.

References

1922 births
2010 deaths
20th-century American businesspeople
American business executives
American designers
American people of Czech-Jewish descent
Auschwitz concentration camp survivors
Buchenwald concentration camp survivors
Businesspeople from New York (state)
Czechoslovak Jews
Czechoslovak emigrants to the United States
Deaths from Parkinson's disease
Neurological disease deaths in New York (state)
People from Delray Beach, Florida
People from Glen Cove, New York
People from Khust
People from Syosset, New York